Dharma Daata is a 1970 Indian Telugu-language drama film, produced by Tammareddy Krishna Murthy under the Ravindra Art Pictures banner and directed by A. Sanjeevi. It stars Akkineni Nageswara Rao and Kanchana, with music composed by T. Chalapathi Rao. It is a remake of the Tamil film Enga Oor Raja (1968), and was a box office success.

Plot 
The film begins with Raja Raghupathi Rao a generous Zamindar of Sripuram, well-renowned for his charity & humanity who leads a happy family life with his wife Suseela, sister Lakshmi, and two sons Shekar & Chakravarthy. Meanwhile, Bhageswaram Zamindar Bhujangam Rao envious of Raghupathi Rao, wants to grab his property by coupling up his son Raju with Lakshmi. During the time of the wedding, Raja Raghupathi Rao is unable to pay some part of the dowry as he is bankrupt for the charities. Right now, Raghupathi Rao mortgages his palace Srinilayam which he adores as a temple. Knowing it, Bhujangam Rao contempts him by pulling his shoulder cloth. Here enraged Raghunatha Rao challenges to regain his Srinilayam and make Bhujangam Rao touch his feet. Thereafter, Suseela passes away after giving birth to a baby girl Jaya when Lakshmi refuses to attend the funeral as bullied by Bhujangam. Therefrom, Raghupathi Rao & sons develop animosity towards her. Grief-stricken Raghupathi Rao reaches the city and takes an oath from his children that they will retrieve Srinilayam.

Years roll by, and Shekar, Chakravarthy, and Jaya grow up, they all work hard and make three-quarters of the money. Besides, Lakshmi tries to get close to her brother's family, as it is her husband's last wish. So, her daughter Padma makes acquaintance with Shekar and cleverly accommodates herself in their house, hiding her identity. Meanwhile, Lakshmi moves with the marriage proposal of her son Prasad with Jaya which Shekar refuses. Parallelly, a glimpse loves track of Chakravarthy with the princess of Vijayapur Rani. After a while, Shekar learns the truth regarding Padma and necks her out. Being cognizant of it, Lakshmi's intention Bhujangam Rao becomes furious when Padma makes him know that Raghupathi Rao is almost on the edge to win. So, he ploys to snatch Srinilayam, makes the money vendor Seth Dayaram threaten Raghupathi Rao, and also steals their hard-earning.

At that moment, Raghupathi Rao's sons accuse and leave him alone when he becomes mentally disturbed. Thereafter, through Padma, Shekar finds the evil design of Bhujangam Rao and retrieves their money. By the time, insane Raghupathi Rao reaches Sripuram to protect his Srinilayam when Bhujangam Rao intrigues to blast the building. At last, Raghupathi Rao teaches the lesson to Bhujangam Rao with the help of his sons and gets back his property. Finally, the movie ends on a happy note with the marriages of Raghupathi Rao's progeny.

Cast 
Akkineni Nageswara Rao as Raja Raghupathi Rao & Sekhar (Dual role)
Kanchana as Padma
Nagabhushanam as Zamindar Bhujanga Rao
Relangi as Bhushanam
Padmanabham as Chakravarthy
Allu Ramalingaiah as Yedukondalu
Sakshi Ranga Rao as Bhaja Govindam
Vallam Narasimha Rao as Satyam
Venkateswara Rao as Seth Dayaram
Eeswara Rao as Prasad
Sowcar Janaki as Suseela
Suryakantham as Vijayapur Rani
Geetanjali as Vijayapur Yuvarani
Anita as Jaya
Jhansi as Lakshmi
Master Aadinarayana Rao as Young Sekhar
Master Visweswara Rao as Young Chakravarthy

Music 

Music was composed by T. Chalapathi Rao. Music released on Audio Company.

Box office 
The film ran for 100 days in 13 centres and the celebrations were held at Shanti Talkies, Hyderabad.

Awards 
 Filmfare Best Film Award (Telugu) – Tammareddy Krishnamurthy (1970).

References

External links 
 

1970 films
1970s Telugu-language films
Films scored by T. Chalapathi Rao
Indian drama films
Telugu remakes of Tamil films